Klemen Bergant (born 14 September 1966) is a Slovenian former alpine skier who competed for Yugoslavia in the 1988 Winter Olympics and for Slovenia in the 1992 Winter Olympics.

External links
 sports-reference.com

1966 births
Living people
Slovenian male alpine skiers
Olympic alpine skiers of Yugoslavia
Olympic alpine skiers of Slovenia
Alpine skiers at the 1988 Winter Olympics
Alpine skiers at the 1992 Winter Olympics
Skiers from Ljubljana
Universiade medalists in alpine skiing
Universiade gold medalists for Yugoslavia
Competitors at the 1989 Winter Universiade